Mario Méndez Montenegro (30 November 1910  31 October 1965) was an assassinated politician and the first elected mayor of Guatemala City. 

Méndez was born in Chiquimulilla, Santa Rosa, on 30 November 1910. He graduated as a lawyer in the national university of Nicaragua. He was a founder of the Popular Liberation Front Party (FLP), which supported future president Juan José Arévalo. It later became the Revolutionary Party (PR) and Méndez became its presidential candidate. He was prevented from participating in the elections because he was assassinated with gunfire on 31 October 1965.

See also 

 César Montenegro Paniagua

 Julio César Méndez Montenegro
 Guatemalan Civil War

References

External links
List of Mayors of Guatemala City (in Spanish)

Assassinated Guatemalan politicians

1910 births
1965 deaths
1960s assassinated politicians